The following is a timeline of the history of the city of Reims, France.

Prior to the 20th century

 3rd century CE
 Roman Catholic diocese of Reims established.
 Porte de Mars built.
 356 – Battle of Durocortorum.
 496 – Clovis I baptized in Reims.
 1139 – "Communal charter" granted by Louis VII of France.
 1179 – Coronation of Philip II of France.
 1380 – Public clock installed (approximate date).
 1429 – Coronation of Charles VII of France.
 1461 - A revolt caused by the salt tax.
 1481 - Fire destroyed the roof and the spires of Reims Cathedral.
 1509 – Palace of Tau rebuilt.
 1547 – Reims University founded.
 1582 – New Testament of the Douay–Rheims Bible printed in Reims.
 1729 – Ruinart champagne house in business.
 1733 –  laid out.
 1770 –  erected.
 1787 – Northern Cemetery established.(fr)
 1792 – September massacres.
 1793 – Population: 32,334.
 1809 – Bibliothèque de la ville (library) founded.
 1814 – Battle of Reims (1814).
 1817 – Chamber of Commerce established.
 1833 – Roederer champagne house in business.
 1843 – Southern Cemetery established.(fr)
 1853 – Courrier de la Champagne newspaper begins publication.
 1867 – Reims Circus built.
 1868 – Indépendant Rémois newspaper begins publication.
 1876 – Population: 81,328.
 1884 – Société de géographie de Reims established.
 1886 – Population: 97,903.
 1887 – Avenir de Reims newspaper begins publication.
 1893 – Western Cemetery established.(fr)
 1899 –  automotive company in business.
 1900 –  automotive company in business.

20th century
 1901 – Emperor Nicholas II of Russia attends in Reims the military review ending the French maneuvers of 1901 upon French president Émile Loubet's invitation
 1906 - Population: 102,800.
 1908 – Henri Farman makes the first cross-country flight from Châlons to Reims.
 1909 – August: Week of Aviation held near Reims.
 1911 – Population: 115,178.
 1913 – Museum of Fine Arts opens.
 1914 – World War I begins.
 1918 – July: Reims besieged by German forces.
 1922 –  built.
 1923 – Protestant Church of Reims rebuilt.
 1926 – Annual Grand Prix de la Marne motor race begins on the Reims-Gueux circuit.
 1928
 Reims – Champagne Air Base begins operating.
 Carnegie Library of Reims opens.
 1929 –  built.
 1931 – Stade de Reims football club formed.
 1935 – City Stadium opens.
 1937 – Gare de Reims built.
 1940 – Battle of France; Germans in power.
 1946 – Reims Aviation in business.
 1953 – 12 Hours of Reims motor race begins.
 1968 – Population: 152,967.
 1971 – University of Reims Champagne-Ardenne established.
 1977 –  district established.
 1979 –  national drama centre active.
 1992 – ESAD de Reims (art school) active.

21st century

 2005 –  established.
 2008 – November: French Socialist Party congress held in Reims.
 2009 –  begins.
 2011 – Reims tramway begins operating.
 2012 – Population: 181,893.
 2014
 March:  held.
  becomes mayor.
 2016 – Reims becomes part of the Grand Est region.

See also
 Reims history
 
 
 
 
  region

Other cities in the Grand Est region:
 Timeline of Metz
 Timeline of Mulhouse
 Timeline of Nancy, France
 Timeline of Strasbourg
 Timeline of Troyes

References

This article incorporates information from the French Wikipedia and German Wikipedia.

Bibliography

in English

in French
 
  4 vols. Written in 17th c.
 
 
 
 
  circa 1904

External links

 Items related to Reims, various dates (via Europeana).
 Items related to Reims, various dates (via Digital Public Library of America).

reims
Reims
reims